Berlin-Wannsee station (in German Bahnhof Berlin-Wannsee) is a railway station opened in 1874 which lies in the Wannsee district of Berlin, the capital city of Germany. It is an important traffic junction in south-west Berlin that is served by the RegionalExpress and RegionalBahn trains of the Deutsche Bahn, the Harz-Berlin-Express of Veolia Verkehr and by the Berlin S-Bahn. In summer, Wannsee serves as the Berlin terminal for DB AutoZug car carrying trains to and from southern Europe.

History

On 13 August 1961, with the construction of Berlin Wall, S-Bahn traffic from Stahnsdorf and Potsdam was discontinued. The only occurrence is that there is only Potsdam-Griebnitzsee shuttle until it was discontinued in 1962. Residents commuted only to East Berlin via the longer Berlin outer ring from Potsdam through regional express trains, and the only trains running on the Berlin–Magdeburg railway was transit traffic from the West Berlin via the GDR to West Germany and other countries.

Later on, after the fall of the Berlin Wall, the line was re-connected to Potsdam again. Reconstruction began in April 1991 and was completed on 1 April 1992. Between the fall of Berlin Wall and 1 April 1992, Potsdam was connected through the fastest way via Griebnitzsee to interchange at Wannsee, besides transit traffic. S1 was temporarily extended from Wannsee to Potsdam Stadt from 2003 to 2006.

S-Bahn line S1 terminates at Wannsee, and operates to and from central Berlin via the Nord-Süd-Tunnel. Line S7 passes through Wannsee on its route to Potsdam Hbf, and operates to and from central Berlin via the Stadtbahn. The two routes to central Berlin diverge by way a flying junction between Wannsee and Nikolassee stations.

The station entrance building lies to the north of the station, and is linked to the platforms by a subway. To the south of the entrance are two island platforms used by the S-Bahn services, and then a single longer island platform used by Deutsche Bahn and Veolia trains. The AutoZug terminal is to the south of the station.

Train services
The station is served by the following services:

Regional services  Magdeburg – Brandenburg – Potsdam – Berlin – Fürstenwalde – Frankfurt (Oder) (– Cottbus)
Regional services  Dessau – Bad Belzig – Michendorf – Berlin – Berlin-Schönefeld Airport – Wünsdorf-Waldstadt
Local services  Wustermark – Golm – Potsdam – Berlin
Local services  Königs Wusterhausen – Berlin-Schönefeld Airport – Saarmund – Golm – Potsdam – Berlin
Local services  Jüterbog – Michendorf – Berlin Wannsee
Berlin S-Bahn services  Wannsee - Steglitz - Schöneberg - Potsdamer Platz - Friedrichstraße - Gesundbrunnen - Wittenau - Oranienburg
Berlin S-Bahn services  Potsdam - Wannsee - Westkreuz - Hauptbahnhof - Alexanderplatz - Ostbahnhof - Lichtenberg - Ahrensfelde

Bus and Ferry services

The station is served by a number of bus routes which stop at a bus interchange in front of the station. These include Berlin routes 114 (to Krankenhaus Heckeshorn), 118 (to Rathaus Zehlendorf and Steinstücken), 218 (to Theodor-Heuss-Platz U-Bahn station and the Pfaueninsel), 316 (to the Glienicker Brücke in Potsdam) and 318 (to the Hahn-Meitner-Institut). Additionally Havelbus route 620 operates to Teltow.

References

External links
Station information 

Berlin S-Bahn stations
Railway stations in Berlin
Buildings and structures in Steglitz-Zehlendorf
Railway stations in Germany opened in 1874